Philip Brown (born March 26, 1958) is an American actor best known for his television performances.

Brown is a native of Coalinga, California. His father, Philip Brown Sr., was a television technician after having been an actor, and his uncle was actor Peter Brown. He graduated from North Hollywood High School.

He first played Billy Martin, the son of Doris Day on The Doris Day Show, from 1968-1971.

Brown portrayed Randy Harford in When the Whistle Blows (1980). He also appeared in the 1980s Dynasty spin-off series The Colbys as Neil Kittredge, in Knots Landing as Brian Johnston in 1991, and in 1993 as Buck Huston in Loving. He also played Steve Kendall, a sportscaster, on Search for Tomorrow in the 1980s.

Brown also made films in South Africa in the 1980s.

He currently works in commercials.

Partial filmography
The Playground (1965) - Fishback
Pretty Maids All in a Row (1971) - Jim Green
Rivals (1981) - Clyde 'Clutch' Turner
Dune Surfer (1988) - Ben Maartens
Back to Freedom (1988) - Dr. Paul Fleming
Wild Zone (1989) - Wayne Garrison
The Nostradamus Kid (1993) - Fuzzy Wuzzy
An American Reunion (2003) - Rob Stefanic

References

External links
 

American male soap opera actors
American male television actors
American male child actors
Living people
1958 births
North Hollywood High School alumni